Chris Lacy (born January 28, 1996) is an American football wide receiver for the Las Vegas Raiders of the National Football League (NFL). He played college football at Oklahoma State, and was signed by the New England Patriots as an undrafted free agent after the 2018 NFL Draft.

College career
Lacy played football at Oklahoma State. He hauled in 63 passes for 920 yards and five touchdowns.
Lacy received his degree in Industrial Engineering and Management.

Professional career

New England Patriots
Lacy signed with the New England Patriots as an undrafted free agent on May 11, 2018. He was waived by the Patriots on May 18, 2018.

Detroit Lions
On May 21, 2018, Lacy was claimed off waivers by the Detroit Lions. He was waived on September 1, 2018 and was signed to the practice squad the next day. He was promoted to the active roster on December 22, 2018.

On September 21, 2019, Lacy was waived by the Lions and re-signed to the practice squad. He was promoted to the active roster on November 27, 2019.

On August 9, 2020, Lacy was waived by the Lions, but re-signed with the team on August 20. He was waived on September 5, 2020.

Dallas Cowboys
On November 3, 2020, Lacy was signed to the Dallas Cowboys practice squad. He signed a reserve/future contract with the Cowboys on January 4, 2021. He was waived by the Cowboys on March 19, 2021.

Chicago Bears
On May 16, 2021, Lacy signed with the Chicago Bears. He was waived on August 31, 2021.

Las Vegas Raiders
On August 10, 2022, Lacy signed with the Las Vegas Raiders. He was waived on August 23, 2022, and re-signed to the practice squad on September 15. He signed a reserve/future contract on January 9, 2023.

References

External links
Oklahoma State Cowboys bio

1996 births
Living people
American football wide receivers
Chicago Bears players
Dallas Cowboys players
Detroit Lions players
Las Vegas Raiders players
New England Patriots players
Oklahoma State Cowboys football players
People from DeSoto, Texas
Players of American football from Texas
Sportspeople from the Dallas–Fort Worth metroplex